I'm Only Looking is a two-disc compilation DVD by INXS. Disc one contains a number of official videos with commentaries for their most famous hits, and the second disc features a number of remastered live and studio rarities.

Track listing

Disc one
 "Just Keep Walking"
 "The One Thing"
 "Don't Change"
 "Original Sin"
 "This Time"
 "What You Need"
 "Kiss the Dirt (Falling Down the Mountain)"
 "Listen Like Thieves"
 "Need You Tonight"
 "Mediate"
 "Devil Inside"
 "Never Tear Us Apart"
 "New Sensation"
 "Mystify"
 "Suicide Blonde"
 "Disappear"
 "Bitter Tears"
 "By My Side"
 "Shining Star"
 "Not Enough Time"
 "Taste It"
 "Baby Don't Cry"
 "Beautiful Girl"
 "The Gift"
 "Elegantly Wasted"

Disc Two
Live/Rare & Docummentary
INXS Live 1980–1997
"Simple Simon (Live Gold Coast 1980)"
"Original Sin (Live Narara 1984)"
"Listen Like Thieves(Live Rockin' The Royals, Melbourne 1985)"
"Kick (Live California 1988)"
"New Sensation (Live 1991)"
"Need You Tonight (Live Osaka 1994)"
"Mediate (Live Osaka 1994)"
"Searching (Live ARIA Awards Sydney 1996)"
"Don't Change (Live Montage 1983-1997)"

ReMixed
"Suicide Blonde (Demolition Mix)"
 "The Stairs (7" single mix)"
"Bitter Tears (Lorimer 12" Mix)"
"Disappear (Extended 12" Mix)"

Welcome to Wherever You Are
 "Heaven Sent"
Rehearsal / Recording
"Taste It"

Pictures from a Full Moon
"Time"
"Make Your Peace"
"I'm Only Looking"
"Please (You Got That...)"

Rare & Unreleased
"The One Thing (Live USA 1983)"
"The Strangest Party (These Are the Times)"
"Everything"
"Searching"
"Don't Lose Your Head"

"Behind the Scenes" documentary

Photo gallery

References

INXS compilation albums
2004 video albums
Live video albums
Music video compilation albums
2004 live albums
2004 compilation albums